The canton of Le Nouvion-en-Thiérache is an administrative division in northern France. It was disbanded following the French canton reorganisation which came into effect in March 2015. It consisted of 9 communes, which joined the canton of Guise in 2015. It had 6,805 inhabitants (2012).

The canton comprised the following communes:

Barzy-en-Thiérache
Bergues-sur-Sambre
Boué
Dorengt
Esquéhéries
Fesmy-le-Sart
Leschelle
La Neuville-lès-Dorengt
Le Nouvion-en-Thiérache

Demographics

See also
Cantons of the Aisne department

References

Former cantons of Aisne
2015 disestablishments in France
States and territories disestablished in 2015